Jablonové is a village in Malacky District in the Bratislava Region of western Slovakia close to the town of Malacky, northwest of Slovakia's capital Bratislava.

Genealogical resources

The records for genealogical research are available at the state archive "Statny Archiv in Bratislava, Slovakia"

 Roman Catholic church records (births/marriages/deaths): 1652-1896 (parish A)

See also
 List of municipalities and towns in Slovakia

References

External links

  Official page

External links
https://web.archive.org/web/20071027094149/http://www.statistics.sk/mosmis/eng/run.html
Surnames of living people in Jablonove

Villages and municipalities in Malacky District